The Vereinigung der Vertragsfußballspieler e. V. (VDV) is the professional footballer's union in Germany. It has approximately 1,300 members, playing in the German professional leagues. Nowadays, it is possible that junior footballers at the beginning of their professional careers, can also be members from the age of fifteen. Footballers who have been playing abroad or having finished their career can stay members.

The union was founded on 15 June 1987 in Offenbach am Main by the former professional footballers Benno Möhlmann, Ewald Lienen and Frank Pagelsdorf, together with colleagues like Guido Buchwald, Florian Gothe, Charly Körbel and Bruno Labbadia. The goal was to work in the interest of the players. Especially important at that time were considered the topics of work and contract conditions, independence of players and their participation, democratization of professional football. In general, the goal is to give the players a common voice towards the clubs and associations.

Presidents 

 1987–1992: Benno Möhlmann
 1992–1994: Stefan Lottermann
 1994–1996 Jürgen Rollmann
 1996–1997 Benno Möhlmann
 1997–1999: Jürgen Sparwasser
 1999–present: Florian Gothe

Awards

Player of the Season

Player of the Year (1998–2003)

Player of the Season (2006–present)

Newcomer of the Season (2010–present)

Coach of the Season (2010–present)

Team of the Season

2008–09

2009–10

2010–11

2011–12

2012–13

2013–14

2014–15

2015–16

2016–17

2017–18

2018–19

2019–20

2020–21

2021–22

Notes

References

External links 
 www.spielergewerkschaft.de Official Website

1987 establishments in West Germany
Association football trade unions
Football in Germany
Trade unions in Germany